The Dillwyn-Llewelyn, later Dillwyn-Venables-Llewelyn Baronetcy, of Penllergare in Llangyfelach and of Ynis-y-gerwn in Cadoxton juxta Neath both in the County of Glamorgan, is a title in the Baronetage of the United Kingdom. It was created on 20 March 1890 for John Dillwyn-Llewelyn. The son of pioneer photographer John Dillwyn Llewelyn, he was Mayor of Swansea in 1891 and Conservative Member of Parliament for Swansea from 1895 to 1900. The second Baronet briefly represented Radnorshire in the House of Commons as a Conservative and served as Lord-Lieutenant of Radnorshire. He assumed the additional surname of Venables. The third Baronet was also Lord-Lieutenant of Radnorshire.

Lewis Llewelyn Dillwyn, uncle of the first Baronet, represented Swansea in Parliament from 1885 until his death in 1892.

Dillwyn-Llewelyn, later Dillwyn-Venables-Llewelyn baronets, of Penllergare and Ynis-y-gerwn (1890)
Sir John Talbot Dillwyn-Llewelyn, 1st Baronet (1836–1927)
Sir Charles Leyshon Dillwyn-Venables-Llewelyn, 2nd Baronet (1870–1951)
Sir (Charles) Michael Dillwyn-Venables-Llewelyn, 3rd Baronet (1900–1976)
Sir John Michael Dillwyn-Venables-Llewelyn, 4th Baronet (born 1938)

There is no heir to the baronetcy.

Notes

References
Kidd, Charles, Williamson, David (editors). Debrett's Peerage and Baronetage (1990 edition). New York: St Martin's Press, 1990, 

History of the Dillwyn-Venables-Llewelyn family

Dillwyn-Venables-Llewelyn
People from Glamorgan